Pong: The Next Level (known simply as Pong in Europe) is a remake of the 1972 Atari game of the same name developed by Supersonic Software and published by Hasbro Interactive.

Gameplay
Pong: The Next Level consists of many levels that are either traditional Pong matches against a computer-controlled opponent in special three-dimensional arenas with special power-ups and environmental gimmicks that affect the way the game is played, or solo challenges that require the player to keep the ball in play and call for precise and skilled moves to win.  An example of the former is "Rock and Roll", where the player must win a Pong match against an opponent on an arena that can tilt or deform, and an example of the latter is "Seal Juggle", where the player must "juggle" a ball on a slanted iceberg and use a special power-up to launch it high up the slope so that a seal can pick it up.  Matches use the "deuce" rule, in which if both contestants are one point away from winning, the player who takes a two-point lead is declared the winner.

Each level has three variations of increasing difficulty: an initial easy variation that awards the player three golden bars, a slightly more difficult one that awards two gold bars and a challenging one that grants one golden bar.  Golden bars are used to unlock other levels and advance to new zones, and players are encouraged to go back and play harder versions of earlier levels if they are unable to get past a newly discovered level.  Collecting golden bars will also cause an in-game crystal Atari logo to slowly change to gold. Filling in one of each of the three bars in the logo by completing one particular variation of every level will grant players access to an emulation of the original Pong game, and two other variants.

All "match" levels support multiplayer, with a special mode for more than two players, named "Last Pong Standing".  In this mode, each player will be randomly assigned to guard a certain part of the arena edge from balls in each round and attempt to "eliminate" opponents by scoring goals against them. Eliminated players will have their goal areas blocked off.  Once one player remains, the round ends and scoring is awarded as follows: the first eliminated player earns no points, subsequently eliminated players are awarded a limited number of points and the last player standing receives full scoring. Subsequent rounds are played until one player reaches the target score.

Reception

Blake Fischer reviewed the PlayStation version of the game for Next Generation, rating it four stars out of five, and stated that "Good dumb fun that will keep you hooked for hours at a time. Just don't tell anybody."

The game received mainly mixed to positive reviews.

References

External links
 
 
 
 
 
 
 
 
 
 

Cancelled Nintendo 64 games
1999 video games
PlayStation (console) games
Classic Mac OS games
Game Boy Color games
Atari games
Head-to-head arcade video games
Paddle-and-ball video games
Table tennis video games
Video game remakes
Video games developed in the United Kingdom
Windows games
Multiplayer and single-player video games
Pong variations
Supersonic Software games
MacSoft games
Morning Star Multimedia games